The prefix Z is used for the People's Republic of China with three exceptions:
 ZK is used for North Korea
 ZM is used for Mongolia
 ZZZZ is a special code which is used when no ICAO code exists for the airport.  It is often used by helicopters not operating at an aerodrome.

Z (except ZK, ZM and ZZZZ) - Mainland China

ZB (Northern China: Beijing, Tianjin, Inner Mongolia, Shanxi, Hebei) 
 ZBAA (PEK) – Beijing Capital International Airport – Beijing
 ZBAD (PKX) – Beijing Daxing International Airport – Beijing
 ZBAL (AXF) – Alxa Left Banner Bayanhot Airport – Alxa Left Banner, Inner Mongolia
 ZBAR (RHT) – Alxa Right Banner Badanjilin Airport – Alxa Right Banner, Inner Mongolia
 ZBBB – Beijing Xijiao Airport – Beijing
 ZBCD (CDE) – Chengde Puning Airport – Chengde, Hebei
 ZBCF (CIF) – Chifeng Yulong Airport – Chifeng, Inner Mongolia
 ZBCZ (CIH) – Changzhi Wangcun Airport – Changzhi, Shanxi
 ZBDH (BPE) – Qinhuangdao Beidaihe Airport – Qinhuangdao, Hebei
 ZBDS (DSN) – Ordos Ejin Horo Airport – Ordos (Dongsheng), Inner Mongolia
 ZBDT (DAT) – Datong Yungang Airport – Datong, Shanxi
 ZBEN (EJN) – Ejin Banner Taolai Airport – Ejin Banner, Inner Mongolia
 ZBER (ERL) – Erenhot Saiwusu International Airport – Erenhot, Inner Mongolia
 ZBES (YIE) – Arxan Yi'ershi Airport – Arxan, Inner Mongolia
 ZBHD (HDG) – Handan Airport – Handan, Hebei
 ZBHH (HET) – Hohhot Baita International Airport – Hohhot, Inner Mongolia
 ZBHZ (HUO) – Holingol Huolinhe Airport – Holingol, Inner Mongolia
 ZBLA (HLD) – Hulunbuir Hailar Airport – Hailar, Inner Mongolia
 ZBLF (LFQ) – Linfen Qiaoli Airport – Linfen, Shanxi
 ZBLL (LLV) – Lüliang Airport – Lüliang, Shanxi
 ZBMZ (NZH) – Manzhouli Xijiao Airport – Manzhouli, Inner Mongolia
 ZBNY (NAY) – Beijing Nanyuan Airport – Beijing
 ZBOW (BAV) – Baotou Erliban Airport – Baotou, Inner Mongolia
 ZBSH – Qinhuangdao Shanhaiguan Airport – Qinhuangdao, Hebei
 ZBSJ (SJW) – Shijiazhuang Zhengding International Airport – Shijiazhuang, Hebei
 ZBTJ (TSN) – Tianjin Binhai International Airport – Tianjin
 ZBTL (TGO) – Tongliao Airport – Tongliao, Inner Mongolia
 ZBTS (TVS) – Tangshan Sannühe Airport – Tangshan, Hebei
 ZBUC (UCB) – Ulanqab Jining Airport – Ulanqab, Inner Mongolia
 ZBUH (WUA) – Wuhai Airport – Wuhai, Inner Mongolia
 ZBUL (HLH) – Ulanhot Airport – Ulanhot, Inner Mongolia
 ZBXH (XIL) – Xilinhot Airport – Xilinhot, Inner Mongolia
 ZBXT (XNT) – Xingtai Dalian Airport – Xingtai, Hebei
 ZBXZ (WUT) – Xinzhou Wutaishan Airport – Xinzhou, Shanxi
 ZBYC (YCU) – Yuncheng Guangong Airport – Yuncheng, Shanxi
 ZBYN (TYN) – Taiyuan Wusu International Airport – Taiyuan, Shanxi
 ZBYZ (RLK) – Bayannur Tianjitai Airport – Bayannur, Inner Mongolia
 ZBZJ (ZQZ) – Zhangjiakou Ningyuan Airport – Zhangjiakou, Hebei
 ZBZL (NZL) – Zhalantun Chengjisihan Airport – Zhalantun, Inner Mongolia

ZG (Southern China: Guangdong, Guangxi, Hunan) 
 ZGBH (BHY) – Beihai Fucheng Airport – Beihai, Guangxi
 ZGBS (AEB) – Baise Bama Airport – Baise, Guangxi
 ZGCD (CGD) – Changde Taohuayuan Airport – Changde, Hunan
 ZGCJ (HJJ) – Zhijiang Airport – Huaihua, Hunan
 ZGCS       – Changsha Datuopu Airport – Changsha, Hunan
 ZGDY (DYG) – Zhangjiajie Hehua Airport – Zhangjiajie (Dayong), Hunan
 ZGFS (FUO) – Foshan Shadi Airport – Foshan, Guangdong
 ZGGG (CAN) – Guangzhou Baiyun International Airport – Guangzhou, Guangdong
 ZGHA (CSX) – Changsha Huanghua International Airport – Changsha, Hunan
 ZGHC (HCJ) – Hechi Jinchengjiang Airport – Hechi, Guangxi
 ZGHY (HNY) – Hengyang Nanyue Airport – Hengyang, Hunan
 ZGHZ (HUZ) – Huizhou Airport – Huizhou, Guangdong
 ZGKL (KWL) – Guilin Liangjiang International Airport – Guilin, Guangxi
 ZGLG (LLF) – Yongzhou Lingling Airport – Yongzhou, Hunan
 ZGMX (MXZ) – Meixian Airport – Meizhou, Guangdong
 ZGNN (NNG) – Nanning Wuxu International Airport – Nanning, Guangxi
 ZGOW (SWA) – Jieyang Chaoshan International Airport – Jieyang/Shantou, Guangdong
 ZGSD (ZUH) – Zhuhai Jinwan Airport – Zhuhai, Guangdong
 ZGSY (WGN) – Shaoyang Wugang Airport – Shaoyang, Hunan
 ZGSZ (SZX) – Shenzhen Bao'an International Airport – Shenzhen, Guangdong
 ZGWZ       – Wuzhou Changzhoudao Airport – Wuzhou, Guangxi
 ZGZH (LZH) – Liuzhou Bailian Airport – Liuzhou, Guangxi
 ZGZJ (ZHA) – Zhanjiang Airport – Zhanjiang, Guangdong

ZH (Central China: Henan, Hubei)
 ZHAY (AYN) – Anyang Airport – Anyang, Henan
 ZHCC (CGO) – Zhengzhou Xinzheng International Airport – Zhengzhou, Henan
 ZHES (ENH) – Enshi Xujiaping Airport – Enshi, Hubei
 ZHHH (WUH) – Wuhan Tianhe Airport – Wuhan, Hubei
 ZHLY (LYA) – Luoyang Beijiao Airport – Luoyang, Henan
 ZHNY (NNY) – Nanyang Jiangying Airport – Nanyang, Henan
 ZHSN (HPG) – Shennongjia Hongping Airport – Shennongjia, Hubei
 ZHSS (SHS) – Shashi Airport – Jingzhou, Hubei
 ZHSY (WDS) – Shiyan Wudangshan Airport – Shiyan, Hubei
 ZHXF (XFN) – Xiangyang Liuji Airport – Xiangyang, Hubei
 ZHYC (YIH) – Yichang Sanxia Airport – Yichang, Hubei

ZJ (Hainan) 
 ZJHK (HAK) – Haikou Meilan International Airport – Haikou, Hainan
 ZJSY (SYX) – Sanya Phoenix International Airport – Sanya, Hainan
 ZJYX – Yongxing Island Airport – Sansha, Hainan

ZL (Northwest China: Gansu, Ningxia, Qinghai, Shaanxi) 
 ZLAK (AKA) – Ankang Wulipu Airport – Ankang, Shaanxi
 ZLDH (DNH) – Dunhuang Airport – Dunhuang, Gansu
 ZLDL (HXD) – Delingha Airport – Delingha, Qinghai
 ZLGL (GMQ) – Golog Maqin Airport – Golog, Qinghai
 ZLGM (GOQ) – Golmud Airport – Golmud, Qinghai
 ZLGY (GYU) – Guyuan Liupanshan Airport – Guyuan, Ningxia
 ZLHX (HTT) – Huatugou Airport – Mangnai, Qinghai
 ZLHZ (HZG) – Hanzhong Chenggu Airport – Hanzhong, Shaanxi
 ZLIC (INC) – Yinchuan Hedong International Airport – Yinchuan, Ningxia
 ZLJC (JIC) – Jinchang Jinchuan Airport – Jinchang, Gansu
 ZLJQ (JGN) – Jiayuguan Airport – Jiayuguan City, Gansu
 ZLLL (LHW) – Lanzhou Zhongchuan International Airport – Lanzhou, Gansu
 ZLQY (IQN) – Qingyang Airport – Qingyang, Gansu
 ZLTS (THQ) – Tianshui Maijishan Airport – Tianshui, Gansu
 ZLXH (GXH) – Gannan Xiahe Airport – Xiahe and Hezuo, Gansu
 ZLXN (XNN) – Xining Caojiabu Airport – Xining, Qinghai
 ZLXY (XIY) – Xi'an Xianyang International Airport – Xi'an, Shaanxi
 ZLYA (ENY) – Yan'an Nanniwan Airport – Yan'an, Shaanxi
 ZLYL (UYN) – Yulin Yuyang Airport – Yulin, Shaanxi
 ZLYS (YUS) – Yushu Batang Airport – Gyêgu, Yushu County, Qinghai
 ZLZW (ZHY) – Zhongwei Shapotou Airport – Zhongwei, Ningxia
 ZLZY (YZY) – Zhangye Ganzhou Airport – Zhangye, Gansu

ZP (Yunnan) 
 ZPBS (BSD) – Baoshan Yunrui Airport – Baoshan, Yunnan
 ZPCW (CWJ) – Cangyuan Washan Airport – Cangyuan, Yunnan
 ZPDL (DLU) – Dali Airport – Dali, Yunnan
 ZPDQ (DIG) – Dêqên Shangri-La Airport – Shangri-La County, Yunnan
 ZPJH (JHG) – Xishuangbanna Gasa Airport – Jinghong, Yunnan
 ZPJM (JMJ) – Lancang Jingmai Airport – Lancang, Yunnan
 ZPLC (LNJ) – Lincang Airport – Lincang, Yunnan
 ZPLJ (LJG) – Lijiang Sanyi Airport – Lijiang, Yunnan
 ZPMS  (LUM) – Dehong Mangshi Airport – Mangshi, Yunnan
 ZPNL (NLH) – Ninglang Luguhu Airport – Ninglang, Yunnan
 ZPPP (KMG) – Kunming Changshui International Airport – Kunming, Yunnan
 ZPSM (SYM) – Pu'er Simao Airport – Pu'er, Yunnan
 ZPWS (WNH) – Wenshan Puzhehei Airport – Wenshan City, Yunnan
 ZPZT (ZAT) – Zhaotong Airport – Zhaotong, Yunnan

ZS (Eastern China: Shanghai, Anhui, Fujian, Jiangsu, Jiangxi, Shandong, Zhejiang)
 ZSAM (XMN) – Xiamen Gaoqi International Airport – Xiamen, Fujian
 ZSAQ (AQG) – Anqing Tianzhushan Airport – Anqing, Anhui
 ZSBB (BFU) – Bengbu Airport – Bengbu, Anhui
 ZSCG (CZX) – Changzhou Benniu Airport – Changzhou, Jiangsu
 ZSCN (KHN) – Nanchang Changbei International Airport – Nanchang, Jiangxi
 ZSDY (DOY) – Dongying Shengli Airport – Dongying, Shandong
 ZSFY (FUG) – Fuyang Xiguan Airport – Fuyang, Anhui
 ZSFZ (FOC) – Fuzhou Changle International Airport – Fuzhou, Fujian
 ZSGZ (KOW) – Ganzhou Huangjin Airport – Ganzhou, Jiangxi
 ZSHC (HGH) – Hangzhou Xiaoshan International Airport – Hangzhou, Zhejiang
 ZSJA (JGS) – Jinggangshan Airport – Ji'an, Jiangxi
 ZSJD (JDZ) – Jingdezhen Luojia Airport – Jingdezhen, Jiangxi
 ZSJH (JUH) – Chizhou Jiuhuashan Airport – Chizhou, Anhui
 ZSJG (JNG) – Jining Qufu Airport – Jining, Shandong
 ZSJJ (JIU) – Jiujiang Lushan Airport – Jiujiang, Jiangxi
 ZSJN (TNA) – Jinan Yaoqiang International Airport – Jinan, Shandong
 ZSJU (JUZ) – Quzhou Airport – Quzhou, Zhejiang
 ZSLD (LCX) – Longyan Guanzhishan Airport – Longyan, Fujian
 ZSLG (LYG) – Lianyungang Baitabu Airport – Lianyungang, Jiangsu
 ZSLQ (HYN) – Taizhou Luqiao Airport – Taizhou, Zhejiang
 ZSLY (LYI) – Linyi Shubuling Airport – Linyi, Shandong
 ZSNB (NGB) – Ningbo Lishe International Airport – Ningbo, Zhejiang
 ZSNJ (NKG) – Nanjing Lukou International Airport – Nanjing, Jiangsu
 ZSNT (NTG) – Nantong Xingdong Airport – Nantong, Jiangsu
 ZSOF (HFE) – Hefei Xinqiao International Airport – Hefei, Anhui
 ZSPD (PVG) – Shanghai Pudong International Airport – Shanghai
 ZSQD (TAO) – Qingdao Liuting International Airport – Qingdao, Shandong
 ZSQZ (JJN) – Quanzhou Jinjiang Airport – Quanzhou, Fujian
 ZSRZ (RIZ) – Rizhao Shanzihe Airport – Rizhao, Shandong
 ZSSH (HIA) – Huai'an Lianshui Airport – Huai'an, Jiangsu
 ZSSL – Shanghai Longhua Airport – Shanghai
 ZSSM (SQJ) – Sanming Shaxian Airport – Sanming, Fujian
 ZSSR (SQD) – Shangrao Sanqingshan Airport – Shangrao, Jiangxi
 ZSSS (SHA) – Shanghai Hongqiao International Airport – Shanghai
 ZSSZ (SZV) – Suzhou Guangfu Airport – Suzhou, Jiangsu
 ZSTX (TXN) – Huangshan Tunxi International Airport – Huangshan, Anhui
 ZSWF (WEF) – Weifang Airport – Weifang, Shandong
 ZSWH (WEH) – Weihai Dashuibo Airport – Weihai, Shandong
 ZSWU (WHU) – Wuhu Airport – Wuhu, Anhui
 ZSWX (WUX) – Sunan Shuofang International Airport – Wuxi and Suzhou, Jiangsu
 ZSWY (WUS) – Wuyishan Airport – Wuyishan and Nanping, Fujian
 ZSWZ (WNZ) – Wenzhou Longwan International Airport – Wenzhou, Zhejiang
 ZSXZ (XUZ) – Xuzhou Guanyin Airport – Xuzhou, Jiangsu
 ZSYA (YTY) – Yangzhou Taizhou Airport – Yangzhou and Taizhou, Jiangsu
 ZSYC (YIC) – Yichun Mingyueshan Airport – Yichun, Jiangxi
 ZSYN (YNZ) – Yancheng Nanyang Airport – Yancheng, Jiangsu
 ZSYT (YNT) – Yantai Penglai International Airport – Yantai, Shandong
 ZSYW (YIW) – Yiwu Airport – Yiwu, Zhejiang
 ZSZS (HSN) – Zhoushan Putuoshan Airport – Zhoushan, Zhejiang

ZU (Southwest China: Chongqing, Guizhou, Sichuan, Tibet) 
 ZUAL (NGQ) – Ngari Gunsa Airport – Shiquanhe, Tibet Autonomous Region
 ZUAS (AVA) – Anshun Huangguoshu Airport – Anshun, Guizhou
 ZUBD (BPX) – Qamdo Bamda Airport – Qamdo, Tibet Autonomous Region
 ZUBJ (BFJ) – Bijie Feixiong Airport – Bijie, Guizhou
 ZUBZ (BZX) – Bazhong Enyang Airport – Bazhong, Sichuan
 ZUCK (CKG) – Chongqing Jiangbei International Airport – Chongqing
 ZUDA (DZH) – Dazhou Jinya Airport – Dazhou, Sichuan
 ZUDC (DCY) – Daocheng Yading Airport – Daocheng, Sichuan
 ZUDX (DAX) – Dazhou Heshi Airport – Dazhou, Sichuan
 ZUGH (GHN) – Guanghan Airport – Guanghan, Sichuan
 ZUGU (GYS) – Guangyuan Panlong Airport – Guangyuan, Sichuan
 ZUGY (KWE) – Guiyang Longdongbao International Airport – Guiyang, Guizhou
 ZUHY (AHJ) – Hongyuan Airport – Hongyuan, Sichuan
 ZUJZ (JZH) – Jiuzhai Huanglong Airport – Jiuzhaigou, Sichuan
 ZUKD (KGT) – Kangding Airport – Kangding, Sichuan
 ZUKJ (KJH) – Kaili Huangping Airport – Kaili, Guizhou
 ZULB (LLB) – Libo Airport – Libo, Guizhou
 ZULP (LIA) – Liangping Airport – Liangping, Chongqing
 ZULS (LXA) – Lhasa Gonggar Airport – Lhasa, Tibet Autonomous Region
 ZULZ (LZO) – Luzhou Yunlong Airport – Luzhou, Sichuan
 ZUMT (WMT) – Zunyi Maotai Airport – Renhuai, Zunyi, Guizhou
 ZUMY (MIG) – Mianyang Nanjiao Airport – Mianyang, Sichuan
 ZUNC (NAO) – Nanchong Gaoping Airport – Nanchong, Sichuan
 ZUNP (HZH) – Liping Airport – Liping, Guizhou
 ZUNZ (LZY) – Nyingchi Mainling Airport – Nyingchi, Tibet Autonomous Region
 ZUPS (LPF) – Liupanshui Yuezhao Airport – Liupanshui, Guizhou
 ZUQJ (JIQ) – Qianjiang Wulingshan Airport – Qianjiang, Chongqing
 ZURK (RKZ) – Shigatse Peace Airport – Shigatse, Tibet Autonomous Region
 ZUTC (TCZ) – Tengchong Tuofeng Airport – Tengchong, Yunnan
 ZUTF (TFU) – Chengdu Tianfu International Airport – Chengdu, Sichuan
 ZUTR (TEN) – Tongren Fenghuang Airport – Tongren, Guizhou
 ZUUU (CTU) – Chengdu Shuangliu International Airport – Chengdu, Sichuan
 ZUWX (WXN) – Wanzhou Wuqiao Airport – Wanzhou, Chongqing
 ZUXC (XIC) – Xichang Qingshan Airport – Xichang, Sichuan
 ZUXJ – Xinjin Airport – Xinjin, Sichuan
 ZUYB (YBP) – Yibin Wuliangye Airport – Yibin, Sichuan
 ZUYI (ACX) – Xingyi Wanfenglin Airport – Xingyi, Guizhou
 ZUZH (PZI) – Panzhihua Bao'anying Airport – Panzhihua, Sichuan
 ZUZY (ZYI) – Zunyi Xinzhou Airport – Zunyi, Guizhou

ZW (Xinjiang) 
 ZWAK (AKU) – Aksu Airport – Aksu, Xinjiang
 ZWAT (AAT) – Altay Airport – Altay, Xinjiang
 ZWBL (BPL) – Bole Alashankou Airport – Bole, Xinjiang
 ZWCM (IQM) – Qiemo Airport – Qiemo, Xinjiang
 ZWFY (FYN) – Fuyun Koktokay Airport – Fuyun, Xinjiang
 ZWHM (HMI) – Hami Airport – Hami, Xinjiang
 ZWKC (KCA) – Kuqa Qiuci Airport – Kuqa, Xinjiang
 ZWKL (KRL) – Korla Airport – Korla, Xinjiang
 ZWKM (KRY) – Karamay Airport – Karamay, Xinjiang
 ZWKN (KJI) – Kanas Airport – Burqin County, Xinjiang
 ZWNL (NLT) – Xinyuan Nalati Airport – Xinyuan County, Xinjiang
 ZWRQ (RQA) – Ruoqiang Loulan Airport – Ruoqiang County, Xinjiang
 ZWSC (QSZ) – Shache Airport – Yarkant County (Shache), Xinjiang
 ZWSH (KHG) – Kashgar Airport – Kashgar, Xinjiang
 ZWSS (SXJ) – Shanshan Airport – Shanshan, Xinjiang
 ZWTC (TCG) – Tacheng Airport – Tacheng, Xinjiang
 ZWTN (HTN) – Hotan Airport – Hotan, Xinjiang
 ZWTP (TLQ) – Turpan Jiaohe Airport – Turpan, Xinjiang
 ZWWW (URC) – Urumqi Diwopu International Airport – Urumqi, Xinjiang
 ZWYN (YIN) – Yining Airport – Yining, Xinjiang

ZY (Northeast China: Heilongjiang, Jilin, Liaoning) 
 ZYAS (AOG) – Anshan Teng'ao Airport – Anshan, Liaoning
 ZYBA (DBC) – Baicheng Chang'an Airport – Baicheng, Jilin
 ZYBS (NBS) – Changbaishan Airport – Baishan, Jilin
 ZYCC (CGQ) – Changchun Longjia International Airport – Changchun, Jilin
 ZYCY (CHG) – Chaoyang Airport – Chaoyang, Liaoning
 ZYDD (DDG) – Dandong Langtou Airport – Dandong, Liaoning
 ZYDQ (DQA) – Daqing Sartu Airport – Daqing, Heilongjiang
 ZYDU (DTU) – Wudalianchi Dedu Airport – Wudalianchi, Heilongjiang
 ZYFY (FYJ) – Fuyuan Dongji Airport – Fuyuan, Heilongjiang
 ZYHB (HRB) – Harbin Taiping International Airport – Harbin, Heilongjiang
 ZYHE (HEK) – Heihe Aihui Airport – Heihe, Heilongjiang
 ZYJD (JGD) – Jiagedaqi Airport – Jiagedaqi, Heilongjiang
 ZYJL (JIL) – Jilin Ertaizi Airport – Jilin City, Jilin
 ZYJM (JMU) – Jiamusi Dongjiao Airport – Jiamusi, Heilongjiang
 ZYJS (JSJ) – Jiansanjiang Airport – Jiansanjiang, Heilongjiang
 ZYJX (JXA) – Jixi Xingkaihu Airport – Jixi, Heilongjiang
 ZYJZ (JNZ) – Jinzhou Bay Airport – Jinzhou, Liaoning
 ZYLD (LDS) – Yichun Lindu Airport – Yichun, Heilongjiang
 ZYMD (MDG) – Mudanjiang Hailang Airport – Mudanjiang, Heilongjiang
 ZYMH (OHE) – Mohe Gulian Airport – Mohe, Heilongjiang
 ZYQQ (NDG) – Qiqihar Sanjiazi Airport – Qiqihar, Heilongjiang
 ZYSQ (YSQ) – Songyuan Chaganhu Airport – Songyuan, Jilin
 ZYTL (DLC) – Dalian Zhoushuizi International Airport – Dalian, Liaoning
 ZYTN (TNH) – Tonghua Sanyuanpu Airport – Tonghua, Jilin
 ZYTX (SHE) – Shenyang Taoxian International Airport – Shenyang, Liaoning
 ZYXC (XEN) – Xingcheng Airport – Xingcheng, Liaoning
 ZYYJ (YNJ) – Yanji Chaoyangchuan Airport – Yanji, Jilin
 ZYYK (YKH) – Yingkou Lanqi Airport – Yingkou, Liaoning

ZK - North Korea 

 ZKPY (FNJ) – Pyongyang International Airport – Pyongyang
 ZKSD (DSO) – Sondok Airport – Chongpyong
 ZKWS (WOS) – Kalma Airport – Wonsan

ZM - Mongolia 

 ZMAH (AVK) – Arvaikheer Airport – Arvaikheer, Övörkhangai
 ZMAT (LTI) – Altai Airport – Altai, Govi-Altai
 ZMBH (BYN) – Bayankhongor Airport – Bayankhongor, Bayankhongor
 ZMBN (UGA) – Bulgan Airport – Bulgan, Bulgan
 ZMBS (HBU) – Bulgan Airport, Khovd – Bulgan, Khovd
 ZMBU (UUN) – Baruun-Urt Airport – Baruun-Urt, Sükhbaatar
 ZMCD (COQ) – Choibalsan Airport – Choibalsan, Dornod
 ZMCK (UBN) – Chinggis Khaan International Airport (aka New Ulaanbaatar International Airport) – Sergelen, Töv
 ZMDN (ULZ) – Donoi Airport – Uliastai, Zavkhan
 ZMDZ (DLZ) – Dalanzadgad Airport – Dalanzadgad, Ömnögovi
 ZMHH (KHR) – Kharkhorin Airport – Kharkhorin, Övörkhangai
 ZMHU (HJT) – Khujirt Airport – Khujirt, Övörkhangai
 ZMKD (HVD) – Khovd Airport – Khovd, Khovd
 ZMMG (MXW) – Mandalgovi Airport – Mandalgovi, Dundgovi
 ZMMN (MXV) – Mörön Airport – Mörön, Khövsgöl
 ZMTG (TSZ) – Tsetserleg Airport – Tsetserleg, Arkhangai
 ZMUB (ULN) – Buyant-Ukhaa International Airport (formerly Buyant Ukhaa Airport) – Ulan Bator (Ulaanbaatar)
 ZMUG (ULO) – Ulaangom Airport – Ulaangom, Uvs
 ZMUH (UNR) – Öndörkhaan Airport – Öndörkhaan, Khentii
 ZMUL (ULG) – Ölgii Airport – Ölgii, Bayan Ölgii

ZZ - Special 

 ZZZZ – Used when no ICAO code exists

See also
 List of airports in China
 List of the busiest airports in China

References

Citations

Sources 
 
  - includes IATA codes
 Aviation Safety Network - IATA and ICAO airport codes
 Chinese airport list and search page on feeyo.com 

Z
 Z
Airports by ICAO code
Airports by ICAO code